Pilon, Pilón or PILON may refer to:

 Pilon (surname)
 Pilon (ankle), the distal articular segment of the tibia
 pilon fracture
 Pilón, a Cuban musical form and a popular dance created in the 1950s
 Pilón, Cuba, a town and municipality in Granma Province, Cuba
 Pilón, Panama, a subdivision of Montijo District in Panama
 Hato Pilón, a district subdivision in Panama
 Puerto Pilón, a subdivision of Colón District in Panama
 PILON, abbreviation for Pay in lieu of notice

See also
 Pylon (disambiguation)